Vinícius dos Santos de Oliveira Paiva (born 1 March 2001) is a Brazilian footballer who plays as a winger for Vasco da Gama.

Career statistics

Club

References

2001 births
Living people
Brazilian footballers
Association football forwards
CR Vasco da Gama players
Footballers from Rio de Janeiro (city)